Jack "the Deacon" Hill was an American running back with the Saskatchewan Roughriders in the Canadian Football League.

Hill is from Ogden, Utah, graduated from Utah State University. He joined the Saskatchewan Roughriders in 1957, but his greatest year was 1958, when he was an all-star and scored a professional football record 145 points (16 touchdowns, 36 converts, 4 field goals and a rouge) and won the Dave Dryburgh Memorial Trophy. He played 3 more seasons with the Green Riders, but was hampered by injuries. His contract was sold to the Denver Broncos in 1961, where he caught 4 passes in 14 games. He later owned a car dealership in Utah.

References

1932 births
2005 deaths
American football placekickers
Canadian football placekickers
Saskatchewan Roughriders players
Denver Broncos (AFL) players
Utah State Aggies football players
Utah State University alumni
Sportspeople from Ogden, Utah
Canadian football wide receivers